The following outline is provided as an overview of and topical guide to film:

Film refers to motion pictures as individual projects and to the field in general.  The name came from the fact that photographic film (also called filmstock) has historically been the primary medium for recording and displaying motion pictures.

What type of thing is film? 
Film can be described as all of the following:

 Art – aesthetic expression for presentation or performance, and the work produced from this activity.
 One of the arts – as an art form, film is an outlet of human expression, that is usually influenced by culture and which in turn helps to change culture. Film is a physical manifestation of the internal human creative impulse. 
 One of the visual arts – visual arts is a class of art forms, including painting, sculpture, photography, printmaking and others, that focus on the creation of works which are primarily visual in nature.
 One of the performing arts – art forms in which artists use their body, voice, or objects to convey artistic expression. Performing arts include a variety of disciplines but all take the form of a performance in front of an audience.
 Fine art – in Western European academic traditions, fine art is art developed primarily for aesthetics, distinguishing it from applied art that also has to serve some practical function. The word "fine" here does not so much denote the quality of the artwork in question, but the purity of the discipline according to traditional Western European canons.
 Show business – a means of providing employment for actors, screenwriters, artisans and technicians, regardless of whether the finished film was produced as a for-profit enterprise or as a not-for-profit public service.

Other names for film 
 Movies 
 Motion pictures
 Talking pictures
 Pictures
 Celluloid
 Flicks (or flickers)
 Photoplays
 Picture shows
 The cinema
 The silver screen (talkie era); the silver sheet (silent era)
 Videos

Essence of film

 Filmmaking – process of making a film. Filmmaking involves a number of discrete stages including an initial story, idea, or commission, through scriptwriting, casting, shooting, editing, and screening the finished product before an audience that may result in a film release and exhibition.  Filmmaking is both an art and an industry. That is why they call it "show business".  It's a show and a business.  Films were originally recorded onto nitrate film stock which was highly flammable.  After the late 1950s, plastic film was used which was shown through a movie projector onto a large screen (in other words, an analog recording process). The adoption of CGI-based special effects led to the use of digital intermediates. Most contemporary films are now fully digital through the entire process of production, distribution, and exhibition from start to finish.

Cinematic genres

Film genre

By setting
Biography - portrays a real-life character in his or her real-life story
Crime - places its character within realm of criminal activity
Fantasy - films set in imaginary worlds, often with a swords and sorcery theme
Film noir - portrays its principal characters in a nihilistic and existentialist realm or manner
Historical - taking place in the past
Science fiction - placement of characters in an alternative reality, typically in the future or in outer space
Sports - sporting events and locations pertaining to a given sport
War - battlefields and locations pertaining to a time of war
Westerns - colonial period to modern era of the western United States

By mood
Action - generally involves a moral interplay between "good" and "bad" played out through violence or physical force
Adventure - involving danger, risk, and/or chance, often with a high degree of fantasy
Comedy - intended to provoke laughter
Drama - mainly focuses on character development
Erotic - sexuality or eroticism and sex acts, including love scenes
Horror - intended to provoke fear in audience
Mystery - the progression from the unknown to the known by discovering and solving a series of clues
Romance - dwelling on the elements of romantic love
Thrillers - intended to provoke excitement and/or nervous tension into audience

By format
Biographical - a biopic is a film that dramatizes the life of an actual person, with varying degrees of basis in fact
Documentary - a factual following of an event or person to gain an understanding of a particular point or issue
Experimental (avant-garde) - created to test audience reaction or to expand the boundaries of film production/story exposition then generally at play
Musical - a film interspersed with singing by all or some of the characters
Silent - a film with no synchronized recorded sound, especially with no spoken dialogue

By production type
Live action - film using actors
Animation - illusion of motion by consecutive display of static images which have been created by hand or on a computer
Television - a film that is produced for and originally distributed by a television network

By length
Short - may strive to contain many of the elements of a "full-length" feature, in a shorter time-frame
Serial - similar to shorts, but forms a constant story arc
Feature film - film that is "full-length"

By age
Children's film - films for young children; as opposed to a family film, no special effort is made to make the film attractive for other audiences
Family - intended to be attractive for people of all ages and suitable for viewing by a young audience; examples of these are Disney films
Teen film - intended for and aimed towards teens although some teen films, such as the High School Musical series; may also be a family film; not all of these films are suitable for all teens, as some are rated R
Adult film - intended to be viewed only by an adult audience, content may include violence, disturbing themes, obscene language, or explicit sexual behaviour. This includes various forms of exploitation films. Adult film may also be used as a synonym for pornographic film.

Cinema by region

History of film

History of film
 Block booking
 Camera obscura  
 Thomas Edison 
 Intertitle – prior to the days of sound film, intertitles (cards with text inserted into the scene) represented dialogue or descriptive/narrative material
 Magic lantern  
 Motion Picture Patents Company  
 Phantasmagoria  
 Silent film  
 Zoetrope – one of several pre-film animation devices which produced the illusion of movement, most popular in the mid- to late 1800s

General film concepts

Film theory
 Academy Awards – an American awards show hosted by the Academy of Motion Pictures Arts and Sciences which recognizes excellence in cinematic achievement, as voted for by the Academy itself. The statuettes handed out to winners are nicknamed "Oscars".
 Actor  
 American Film Institute  
 B movie
 Film directing  
Film editing
 Film studio  
 Movie projector  
 Cinematography 
 Set construction 
 Sound stage

Film formats
List of film formats

Films

List of films by title: #, A, B, C, D, E, F, G, H, I, J-K, L, M, N-O, P, Q-R, S, T, U-V-W, & X-Y-Z
List of years in film

Films by genre 

List of action films
List of adventure films
List of animated feature-length films
List of biographical films
List of cinematic genres
List of comedy films
List of comedy-drama films
List of crime films
List of drama films
List of disaster films
List of fantasy films
List of films featuring extraterrestrials
List of films noir
List of gangster movies
List of historical drama films
List of horror films
List of lesbian, gay, bisexual or transgender-related films
List of mystery films
List of punk movies
List of racism-related movies
Lists of science fiction films
List of sports films
List of thriller films
List of war films
List of Western films

Films by origin 

 List of films by region and country of origin

Films by setting location 

 Lists of films based on location

Films by cost 

 List of most expensive films
 List of most expensive non-English-language films

Films by success 
List of films considered the best
List of highest-grossing films
List of films considered the worst
List of Academy Award-winning films
Lists of box office number-one films

Films by movement

Absolute film (1920s)
Budapest school (1972 - 1984)
Cinéma du look (1980s)
Cinema Novo (1960 - early 1970s)
Czechoslovak New Wave (1960s)
Dogme 95 (1995 - 2005)
Free Cinema (1956 - 1959)
French New Wave (1958 - late 1960s)
German Expressionism (1913 -1920s)
Grupo Cine Liberación (1969 - 1971)
Hong Kong New Wave (1979 - early 1990s)
Italian neorealism (1944 - 1952)
Japanese New Wave (1956 - 1976)
Kammerspielfilm (1920s)
L.A. Rebellion (1967 - 1989)
Mumblecore (2002 - )
New French Extremity (1999 - 2003)
New Hollywood (Summer 1967 through Spring 1983)
New Nigerian Cinema (2006 - )
New Queer Cinema (1990s)
No Wave (1976 - 1985)
Parallel Cinema (1952 - 1976)
Poetic Realism (1930s - 1940s)
Polish Film School (1955 - 1963)
Pure Film Movement (1910s - 1920s)
Remodernist film (2004 - )
Surrealist Cinema (1920s)
Third Cinema (1969 - 1978)
Yugoslav Black Wave (1963 - 1972)

Film companies
List of film production companies
List of film production companies by country
List of film distributors by country

Film studios

Major film studios

Majors (Big Five)

 Walt Disney Studios – American film studio owned by The Walt Disney Company, founded in 1923
Sony Pictures Motion Picture Group (a subsidiary of Sony Pictures) – American film studio owned by Sony, founded in 1924
 Paramount Pictures (a subsidiary of Paramount Global) – American film studio owned by Paramount Global, founded in 1912
 Universal Studios (a subsidiary of NBCUniversal) – American film studio owned by Comcast, founded in 1912
 Warner Bros. (a subsidiary of Warner Bros. Discovery) – American film studio owned by Warner Bros. Discovery, founded in 1923

Others

 Lionsgate
 Lantern Entertainment
 MGM

Awards and festivals
List of film awards
List of film festivals
List of Academy Awards ceremonies
AFI 100 Years... series
List of Golden Globe Awards ceremonies

Notable people from the film industry
Show business families
Soundtrack composers

Film theorists
 Rudolf Arnheim
 André Bazin
 Sergei Eisenstein
 Siegfried Kracauer
 Lev Kuleshov
 Vsevolod Pudovkin

Famous film producers

Notable film producers
 George Lucas
 David O. Selznick
 Jerry Bruckheimer

Famous directors

Notable film and television directors
 Woody Allen
 Kathryn Bigelow
 James Cameron
 Yash Chopra
 Joel and Ethan Coen
 Francis Ford Coppola
 Michael Curtiz
 David Fincher
 Victor Fleming
 Werner Herzog
 Alfred Hitchcock
 Peter Jackson
 Alejandro Jodorowsky
 Stanley Kubrick
 Fritz Lang
 Sergio Leone
 Sidney Lumet
 David Lynch
 Christopher Nolan
 Martin Scorsese
 Steven Spielberg
 Quentin Tarantino
 Billy Wilder
 Sam Wood
 William Wyler
 Satyajit Ray

Famous actors

Notable actors
 Humphrey Bogart 
 Marlon Brando 
 James Cagney 
 Russell Crowe 
 Denzel Washington
 Tom Cruise
 Bette Davis
 Leonardo DiCaprio
 Alec Guinness
 Tom Hanks
 Audrey Hepburn
 Katharine Hepburn
 Amitabh Bachchan
 Anthony Hopkins
 Christopher Lee
 Jack Lemmon
 Daniel Day-Lewis
 Walter Matthau
 Al Pacino
 Edward G. Robinson

See also

 Film industry
 Filmmaking
 Independent film
 List of film festivals
 List of motion picture production equipment

References

External links

 Allmovie - information on films: actors, directors, biographies, reviews, cast and production credits, box office sales, and other movie data
 Film Site - reviews of classic films
 Rottentomatoes.com - movie reviews, previews, forums, photos, cast info
 The Internet Movie Database (IMDb) - information on current and historical films and cast listings

 
Film
Film